Zhou Bo Quan is a paralympic athlete from China competing mainly in category F13 throws events.

Zhou Bo Quan first competed in the 2000 Summer Paralympics in all three throws, shot, javelin and discus, but it wasn't until the following games in Athens that he won his first medal, a silver in the F13 javelin as well as again competing in the discus.

References

External links
 

Year of birth missing (living people)
Living people
Chinese male discus throwers
Chinese male shot putters
Chinese male javelin throwers
Paralympic athletes of China
Paralympic silver medalists for China
Paralympic medalists in athletics (track and field)
Athletes (track and field) at the 2000 Summer Paralympics
Athletes (track and field) at the 2004 Summer Paralympics
Medalists at the 2004 Summer Paralympics
Visually impaired discus throwers
Visually impaired javelin throwers
Visually impaired shot putters
Paralympic discus throwers
Paralympic javelin throwers
Paralympic shot putters
21st-century Chinese people